Vagos is a town and a municipality in Aveiro District, belonging to Centro Region of Portugal. The district capital, Aveiro, is its nearest large city. Its population in 2011 was 22,851 in an area of 164.92 km2, and it had 17,204 eligible voters.

In Roman times, the municipality was called Vacus, and had both coastline and large sand dune valleys just east of its center. Increases in sedimentation and sand drifts leveled and lengthened these distances. According to Antonio Gomes da Rocha Madail and other writers, there is tradition among the native population that they are descendants of the seafaring salt farmers of Phoenicia.

Due to its fertile soils, agriculture plays a major role in the municipality's economy. Its green meadows create exceptional conditions for cattle breeding and milk production at a national level. The forest areas and vegetable production are other sources of prosperity for the municipality. Ceramics are the principal money-maker in its industrial sector.

It is part of the intermunicipal community of Região de Aveiro.

Its present mayor is Silvério Rodrigues Regalado, elected by the Social Democratic Party.

The municipal holiday is the Monday after Whit Sunday. Its mother church honors Saint James.

Demographics

Cities and towns
 Sosa (town)
 Vagos (town)

Parishes
Administratively, the municipality is divided into 8 civil parishes (freguesias):
 Calvão
 Fonte de Angeão e Covão do Lobo
 Gafanha da Boa Hora
 Ouca
 Ponte de Vagos e Santa Catarina
 Santo André de Vagos
 Sosa
 Vagos e Santo António

Famous people
Manuel Freire, (born 1942), Portuguese singer and composer.
Diogo Sarabando, Portuguese singer and composer, known as Himalion.

See also
Associação Desportiva de Vagos, women's basketball club founded in 1994.
Vagos Open Air, metal festival since 2009.

References

External links
Municipality official website
Photos from Vagos

 
Municipalities of Aveiro District